Ellie Johnston may refer to:
 Ellie Johnston (rugby league)
 Ellie Johnston (cricketer)